Marko Pervan (born 4 April 1996) is a Croatian professional footballer who plays as an attacking midfielder for Leotar Trebinje.

Career
Pervan started training with his father, a coach and a former football player, at NK Međugorje. In 2010 he went to nearby Metković, before moving on to the newly established Adriatic Split academy. In 2012, Pervar joined the top-tier RNK Split academy.

Pervan started his professional career with Split in the 1. HNL in 2014. After two seasons with the club, which also included a half-season loan stints with Imotski and Šibenik, he joined Cibalia. On 19 February 2018, Pervan was transferred to Osijek. While at Osijek, he was loaned out to Skënderbeu. In July 2019, he joined Bulgarian First League club Botev Plovdiv. He left Botev in January 2020.

On 10 February 2020, Pervan signed a one-year contract with Bosnian Premier League club Široki Brijeg. He made his official debut and scored his first goal for Široki Brijeg in a 2–2 league draw against Borac Banja Luka on 23 February 2020. Pervan left Široki Brijeg in December 2020.

On 19 January 2021, Pervan joined Polish I liga club Korona Kielce on a deal until June 2022. On 28 February 2022, he left the club by mutual consent.

References

External links
 

1996 births
Living people
Sportspeople from Metković
Association football midfielders
Croatian footballers
RNK Split players
NK Imotski players
HNK Šibenik players
HNK Cibalia players
NK Osijek players
KF Skënderbeu Korçë players
Botev Plovdiv players
NK Široki Brijeg players
Korona Kielce players
FK Leotar players
Croatian Football League players
First Football League (Croatia) players
Kategoria Superiore players
First Professional Football League (Bulgaria) players
Premier League of Bosnia and Herzegovina players
I liga players
Croatian expatriate footballers
Expatriate footballers in Albania
Croatian expatriate sportspeople in Albania
Expatriate footballers in Bulgaria
Croatian expatriate sportspeople in Bulgaria
Expatriate footballers in Bosnia and Herzegovina
Croatian expatriate sportspeople in Bosnia and Herzegovina
Expatriate footballers in Poland
Croatian expatriate sportspeople in Poland